Procambarus zonangulus, the white river crawfish, white river crayfish or southern white river crayfish, is a species of freshwater crayfish.

Distribution
Procambarus zonangulus was originally described from Jefferson County, Hardin County and Orange County, Texas, where it lives in streams, but the species' natural distribution is unclear, possibly including parts of Alabama, Louisiana and Mississippi. It has also been introduced to other states, including Maryland and West Virginia.

Conservation
P. zonangulus has become an important species for aquaculture, and 20%–30% of the crayfish harvested in Louisiana are P. zonangulus. Due to the taxonomic uncertainties, this species is listed as Data Deficient on the IUCN Red List.

References

Cambaridae
Endemic fauna of the United States
Freshwater crustaceans of North America
Crustaceans described in 1990
Taxa named by Horton H. Hobbs Jr.
Edible crustaceans